Dennis Wood (1934-2001) was a Welsh geologist who did important work on strain analysis. In his work on the Geology of Anglesey, Wood argued for the complex mix of lithologies in the north of the island to be an olistostrome related to a subduction zone.

References 

1934 births
2001 deaths
Welsh geologists